Holden is an Australian subsidiary of General Motors.

Holden may also refer to:

Places

Norway
 Holden (Lierne), a lake in Trøndelag
 Holden (Verran), a lake in Trøndelag
 Holden, former name of Holla, Telemark

United States
 Holden, Louisiana, an unincorporated community
 Holden, Maine, a town
 Holden, Massachusetts, a town
 Holden, Missouri, a city
 Holden Beach, North Carolina, a small incorporated seaside town south of Wilmington, NC
 Holden, North Dakota, an unorganized territory
 Holden, Ohio, an unincorporated community
 Holden, Utah, a town
 Holden, West Virginia, a census-designated place
 Holden Township, Minnesota
 Holden Township, Adams County, North Dakota, a defunct township

Other
 Holden Nunataks, four nunataks in Palmer Land, Antarctica
 Holden, Alberta, Canada, a village
 Holden Lake, Ontario, Canada
 Holden Park, in the village of Oakworth, West Yorkshire, England

Extraterrestrial
 Holden (lunar crater)
 Holden (Martian crater)
 2974 Holden, an asteroid

People and fictional characters
 Holden (surname), including a list of people and fictional characters
 Holden (given name), including a list of people and fictional characters
 Holden Scott, a pen name of American author Ben Mezrich (born 1969)

Business
 Holden New Zealand, a sales subsidiary for General Motors
 Holden Outerwear, a brand of snowboarding-related clothing
 Holden Foundation Seeds, an American company that specializes in the research, development and production of foundation seed corn
 Holdens Brewery, Sedgley, Staffordshire, England

Other uses
 Holden baronets, three titles in the Baronetage of the United Kingdom, two of which are extant
 Holden (band), a French pop-rock band
 Holden Arboretum, Kirtland, Ohio
 Holden Chapel, the third-oldest building at Harvard University
 Holden Choirs, the collective name of Harvard University's Harvard Glee Club, Radcliffe Choral Society, and Harvard-Radcliffe Collegium Musicum
 Holden Lutheran Church Parsonage, Kenyon, Minnesota, on the National Register of Historic Places
 Holden Medical Institute, an American accredited nursing school
 Holden railway station, Melbourne, Victoria, Australia
 Holdens railway station, Woodville, South Australia
 Holden High School (disambiguation), various schools

See also
 Holden Beach, North Carolina
 Holdenville, Oklahoma
 Holden Heights, Florida
 Holden Village, Washington
 Holder (disambiguation)
 Holding (disambiguation)